Heroic virtue is a phrase coined by Augustine of Hippo to describe the virtue of early Christian martyrs and used by the Catholic Church.  The Greek pagan term hero described a person with possibly superhuman abilities and great goodness, and "it connotes a degree of bravery, fame, and distinction which places a man high above his fellows".  The term was later applied to other highly virtuous persons who do extraordinary good works.

Heroic virtue is one of the requirements for beatification in the Catholic Church.  The modern process for declaring heroic virtue is internal to the church and conducted by those in senior positions.

Quoting the Catholic view  from the article on Heroic Virtue by J. Wilhelm in the 1917 Catholic Encyclopedia:

Together with the four cardinal virtues the Christian saint must be endowed with the three theological virtues, especially with Divine charity, the virtue which informs all other virtues.

As charity stands at the summit of all virtues, so faith stands at their foundation. For by faith God is first apprehended, and the soul lifted up to supernatural life. Faith is the secret of one's conscience; to the world it is made manifest by the good works in which it lives, "Faith without works is dead" (James 2:2). Such works are: the external profession of faith, strict observance of the Divine commands, prayer, filial devotion to the Church, the fear of God, the horror of sin, penance for sins committed, patience in adversity, etc. All or any of these attain the grade of heroicity when practiced with unflagging perseverance, during a long period of time, or under circumstances so trying that by them men of but ordinary perfection would be deterred from acting.

Hope is a firm trust that God will give us eternal life and all the means necessary to obtain it; it attains heroicity when it amounts to unshakeable confidence and security in God's help throughout all the untoward events of life, when it is ready to forsake and sacrifice all other goods in order to obtain the promised felicity of heaven. 

Charity inclines man to love God above all things with the love of friendship. The perfect friend of God says with St. Paul: "With Christ I am nailed to the cross. And I live, now not I; but Christ liveth in me" (Galatians 2:19-20). For love means union. Its type in heaven is the Divine Trinity in Unity; its highest degree in God's creatures is the beatific vision, i.e. participation in God's life. On earth it is the fruitful mother of holiness, the one thing necessary, the one all-sufficient possession. It is extolled in I Cor., xiii, and in St. John's Gospel and Epistles; the beloved disciple and the fiery missionary of the cross are the best interpreters of the mystery of love revealed to them in the Heart of Jesus. With the commandment to love God above all Jesus coupled another: "And the second is like to it: Thou shalt love thy neighbor as thyself. There is no other commandment greater than these" (Mark 12:31). The likeness, or the linking of the two commandments, lies in this: that in our neighbor we love God's image and likeness, His adopted children and the heirs of His Kingdom. Hence, serving our neighbor is serving God. And the works of spiritual and temporal mercy performed in this world will decide our fate in the next: "Come, ye blessed of my Father, possess you the kingdom. . .For I was hungry, and you gave me to eat. . .Amen I say to you, as long as you did it to one of these my least brethren, you did it to me".

Prudence, which enables us to know what to desire or to avoid, attains heroicity when it coincides with the "gift of counsel", i.e. a clear, Divinely aided insight into right and wrong conduct.

Justice, which gives every one his due, is the pivot on which turn the virtues of religion, piety, obedience, gratitude, truthfulness, friendship, and many more. Jesus sacrificing His life to give God His due, Abraham willing to sacrifice his son in obedience to God's will, these are acts of heroic justice.

Fortitude, which urges us on when difficulty stands in the way of our duty, is itself the heroic element in the practice of virtue; it reaches its apex when it overcomes obstacles which to ordinary virtue are insurmountable.

Temperance, which restrains us when passions urge us to what is wrong, comprises becoming deportment, modesty, abstinence, chastity, sobriety, and others.

In fine it should be remarked that almost every act of virtue proceeding from the Divine principle within us has in it the elements of all the virtues; only mental analysis views the same act under various aspects.

References

External links
Catholic Encyclopedia "Heroic Virtue"

Beatifications
Virtue